Ministry of Public Security of Burundi is the ministry of the interior of Burundi. The minister since 2007 is Venant Kamana. The armed conflict is particularly severe in Bujumbura Rural Province. The clearing of land mines is among the tasks of the ministry.

References

Government of Burundi
Law enforcement agencies of Burundi